Tymberlee Hill is an American actress and comedian, best known for her roles on comedy programs such as Marry Me, Drunk History, The Hotwives, Search Party and Perfect Harmony.

Career
Hill grew up in Virginia Beach, Virginia. In 2003, she received her graduate degree from the Shakespeare Theatre's Academy for Classical Acting at George Washington University. A classically trained stage actor, Hill started performing in comedy after moving to Los Angeles and beginning to perform at the Upright Citizens Brigade Theatre.

She continues to perform at the UCB Theatre. In 2014, Hill began playing the role of Phe Phe Reed in the Hulu sitcom The Hotwives. In 2014, Hill was cast in the NBC comedy series Marry Me as a series regular, playing the role of Kay until the series' cancellation after one season. She has a recurring role as Detective Joy on season two of the TBS mystery-comedy Search Party.

Filmography

Film

Television

References

External links

21st-century American actresses
American film actresses
American television actresses
Living people
American women comedians
Year of birth missing (living people)
People from Virginia Beach, Virginia
Actresses from Virginia
21st-century American comedians
Upright Citizens Brigade Theater performers
George Washington University alumni
African-American female comedians